Allium basalticum is a plant species found in Israel, Jordan, and Lebanon, and formerly considered under Allium nigrum. Bulbs are egg-shaped, up to 30 mm long. Scape is straight, round in cross-section, up to 60 cm tall. Leaves are narrowly lanceolate, up to 50 cm long. Tepals are white with conspicuous green midveins; anthers yellow; ovary deep purple at flowering time, later turning green.

References

Bibliography 

 

basalticum
Onions
Flora of Israel
Flora of Lebanon
Flora of Jordan
Flora of Palestine (region)
Plants described in 2011